The Ambassador and Permanent Representative of Australia to the Organisation for Economic Co-operation and Development is an officer of the Australian Department of Foreign Affairs and Trade and the head of the delegation of the Commonwealth of Australia to the Organisation for Economic Co-operation and Development (OECD) in Paris, France. The position has the rank and status of an Ambassador Extraordinary and Plenipotentiary and has been sent since Australia, represented by Deputy Prime Minister Doug Anthony and Ambassador to France Alan Renouf, acceded to the OECD on 7 June 1971. The delegation to the OECD is based with the Australian Embassy in Paris and the Ambassador has resided in the Embassy since its opening in 1978.

List of Permanent Representatives

References

External links
Australian Embassy, France – OECD Delegation
OECD – Australia: Ambassador, Permanent Representative to the OECD

 
Organisation for Economic Co-operation and Development